The 1898 Argentine Primera División was the 7th season of top division football in Argentina. It was won by Lomas, achieving its 5th Argentine championship in 6 seasons. The runner-up was Lobos. Flores AC and Belgrano AC "B" left the championship, being replaced by Lobos -which returned to the Association- and new team United Banks.

Primera división

Final standings

Championship playoff 
Lomas and Lobos finished first with 20 points each so they had to play a match to define a champion. After the first game was declared null by the Association attending to a request by Lobos, a second match was played, with Lomas winning the title.

Rematch

References

Argentine Primera División seasons
1898 in Argentine football
1898 in South American football